is a railway station on the Hokuriku Railroad Ishikawa Line in the city of Kanazawa, Ishikawa Prefecture, Japan, operated by the private railway operator Hokuriku Railroad (Hokutetsu).

Lines

Station layout
The station consists of one side platform serving a single bi-directional track. The station is unattended.

Adjacent stations

History
Shijima Station opened on 22 June 1915.

Surrounding area
 Shijima Elementary School
 Kanazawa Murata Manufacturing Co., Ltd
 Ikeda Hospital
 Arcland Sakamoto Co., Ltd

See also
 List of railway stations in Japan

References

External links

 Shijima Station information 

Railway stations in Ishikawa Prefecture
Railway stations in Japan opened in 1915
Hokuriku Railroad Ishikawa Line